Kawulok is a Polish surname. Notable people with the surname include:

Jan Kawulok (1946–2021), Polish Nordic combined skier
Stanisław Kawulok (born 1953), Polish Nordic combined skier

Polish-language surnames